The Mi2, also branded as PDC Touch, is a handheld game console developed and created by Dutch company Planet Interactive in Benelux and branded as Mi2. The Chinese manufacturer Conny Technology and the French manufacturer Videojet branded it as PDC Touch Media (an officially shortened name for Pocket Dream Console Touch) in France, Germany, Spain, Portugal and the UK. It was released in October 2009, being the successor of the Pocket Dream Console from 2005.

In 2010, and upgraded version, called the Mi2 XL, was released in Benelux only, featuring 5 more games than the original console.

Overview
With a very similar design to the Dingoo, the Mi2/PDC Touch has more features than the Dingoo, such as an accelerometer, a camera and a touchscreen. It also has a 16GB flash memory, with 512MB free memory. The console is aimed at under 11 year olds. When it was launched, it was priced at €99.99 in Benelux. It was then dropped down to €59.99.

Games
The Mi2/PDC Touch features 100 built-in games (Mi2 XL features 105), mostly unofficial clones of other popular titles. When launched there was a promise that extra games could be downloaded (for a fee) from the internet, but it wasn't until September 2010 that this option was realized.

The built in games are of the following categories:
 Animal training
 Balancing
 Bowling
 Brain training
 Camera games
 Colouring
 Drawing
 Educational
 Fashion Design
 Music Mix creation
 Puzzle
 Racing

Memory and CPU
 CPU: MIPS based processor
 Memory: 16GB of which 512MB free for use
 Memory: Mini SD-Card slot
 Memory: SAMSUNG  K9GAG08U0M-PCB0 16GB NAND Flash
 Memory: Etrontech EM63A165TS-6G - 16Mega x 16 Synchronous DRAM (SDRAM)

Features
 A/V port: The system can be connected to a TV or other equipment with a custom cable for composite video and mono audio (included).
 Mini USB B connector.
 Mini headphone jack.
 Microphone
 MP3 files for audio/music
 MP4 and AVI files for video
 JPEG files for images, using PhotoFrame
 Buttons: D-pad, shoulder buttons, menu buttons, and four action buttons
 3.5" backlit TFT LCD screen.
 Touch screen
 Motion sensor
 0.3 megapixel camera

Power, Display, Audio and Accessories
 Power: Built in 1200 mAh battery
 Display: Full colour
 Display: Resolution: 320x240
 Display: Backlight
 Audio: Headset output
 Audio: Stereo speakers
 Accessories: Touch-screen stylus
 Accessories: Hand-strap
 Accessories: Headset
 Accessories: AV cable

See also 
 Pocket Dream Console

References

External links
 Official site from Conny (in Chinese)
 Mi2 Indexing page (Dutch)
           Mi2 Forum (Dutch)

Handheld game consoles
Products introduced in 2009
MIPS-based video game consoles